James Hale (1810-1865) was a politician.

James Hale may also refer to:

Dr. James W. Hale House

See also
James Hales, English judge, Baron of the Exchequer